Raglan (also known as Ragland and Rhaglan) was an ancient hundred of Monmouthshire. 

It contained the following ancient parishes:

Betws Newydd
Bryngwn
Chapel Hill
Cilgwrwg
Cwmcarfan
Devauden
Llandenny
Llandevenny hamlet
Llandogo
Llangoven
Llanishen
Llanvihangel Tor y Mynydd
Llansoe
Llanvihangel-Ystern-Llewern
Mitchell Troy
Pen Rhos township
Pen y Clawdd
Penalt
Raglan
Tregare
Trelleck Grange
Tryleg
Wolvesnewton

It is now administered by the local authority of Monmouthshire.

References